Brohard (also Hartley or Hartley Brohard) is an unincorporated community in Ritchie and Wirt counties in the U.S. state of West Virginia.  Its elevation is 965 feet (294 m).  Brohard had a post office, which closed on November 2, 2002.

M. M. Brohard, a local merchant, gave the community his name.

References

Unincorporated communities in Ritchie County, West Virginia
Unincorporated communities in Wirt County, West Virginia
Unincorporated communities in West Virginia